Have a Heart (film), a 1934 drama film directed by David Butler
 Have a Heart (TV series), a 1955 game show
 "Have a Heart," a 1989 song written by Bonnie Hayes and recorded by Bonnie Raitt for her album Nick of Time
 "Just Have a Heart", a song recorded in 1990 by Celine Dion for her album Unison; originally titled "Just Have a Heart," it was recorded by Angela Clemmons in 1987; Dion also recorded a French-language version of this song in 1987, titled "Partout je te vois" and featured on Incognito